The 1946 Ohio State Buckeyes football team was an American football team that represented Ohio State University in the 1946 Big Ten Conference football season. In Paul Bixler's only season as head coach, the Buckeyes compiled a 4–3–2 record (2–3–1 against conference opponents) and were outscored by a total of 170 to 166. The Buckeyes were ranked No. 12 in the AP Poll on November 4, 1946, but lost the final two games of their season against No. 9 Illinois and No. 8 Michigan. Right guard Warren Amling, a veterinary student, was elected as team captain.

Schedule

Awards and honors
Tackle Warren Amling was a consensus first-team pick on the 1946 All-America college football team. Three Ohio State players received honors from the Associated Press (AP) or United Press (UP) on the 1946 All-Big Nine Conference football team: end Cecil Souders (AP-1, UP-1); Amling (AP-1, UP-2); and fullback Joe Whisler (UP-1). Souders was also selected by his teammates as the team's most valuable player.

Statistics
On offense, the Buckeyes averaged 94.2 passing yards and 199.4 rushing yards. On defense, they allowed an average of 106.6 passing yards and 176.9 rushing yards. The team's statistical leaders included quarterback George Spencer with 398 passing yards, fullback Joseph Whisler with 544 rushing yards, and Bob Brugge with 193 receiving yards.

Personnel

Players

 Warren Amling, tackle
 Dave Bonnie
 Bob Brugge
 Michael Cannavino
 Jameson Crane
 Traian Dendiu
 William Doolittle
 Charles Gandee
 Tommy James
 Carlton Kessler
 Jerry Krall
 Richard Palmer
 Ernest Parks
 Pete Perini
 Thomas Phillips
 Richard Slager
 Cecil Souders, end
 George Spencer, quarterback
 Rodney Swinehart
 Alex Verdova
 Joe Whisler, fullback
 Russell Wolfe

Coaching staff
 Paul Bixler, head coach, first year
 Sam T. Selby, assistant

NFL Draft

The 1947 NFL Draft was held on December 16, 1946. The following Buckeyes were selected.

References

Ohio State
Ohio State Buckeyes football seasons
Ohio State Buckeyes football